The Avco/Pratt & Whitney T800 (company designation APW34) was a turboshaft engine for rotary wing applications, and was produced by Avco/Pratt & Whitney (APW), a joint venture between Avco Lycoming and Pratt & Whitney. The engine was developed for the United States Army's LHX armed reconnaissance helicopter competition to develop the Boeing-Sikorsky RAH-66 Comanche, but lost to the competing LHTEC T800 in 1988.

See also

References

 

1980s turboshaft engines
T800
T800